Bijvard (also Romanized as Bījvard; also known as Bījvar, Bijwar, Bīzhvard, and Borjak) is a village in Kuhpayeh Rural District Rural District, in the Central District of Bardaskan County, Razavi Khorasan Province, Iran. At the 2006 census, its population was 455, in 144 families. Bijvard in the region of Razavi Khorasan is located in Iran - some 372 mi (or 598 km) East of Tehran, the country's capital.

References 

Populated places in Bardaskan County